Strzelecki is a rural locality in the local government area (LGA) of Flinders in the North-east LGA region of Tasmania. The 2016 census recorded a population of nil for the state suburb of Strzelecki.

History 
Strzelecki is a confirmed locality.

Geography
The waters of Bass Strait form the south-eastern boundary. Most of the locality boundaries are common to the Strzelecki National Park.

Road infrastructure 
Route C806 (Trousers Point Road / Big River Road) provides access to the locality.

References

Towns in Tasmania
Flinders Island